The 2001–02 Florida Panthers season was their ninth season in the National Hockey League. The Panthers failed to qualify for the playoffs for the second consecutive season.

Offseason
Prior to the beginning of the regular season it was announced that Pavel Bure and Paul Laus would alternate the captaincy every five games. This was discontinued when Mike Keenan was named the team’s new head coach in early December.

Regular season
On December 3, it was announced that Mike Keenan would replace Duane Sutter as head coach and Bill Torrey would step down as general manager. Assistant general manager Chuck Fletcher was named interim general manager.

Final standings

Schedule and results

|- align="center" bgcolor="#FFBBBB"
|1||L||October 4, 2001||2–5 || align="left"| @ Philadelphia Flyers (2001–02) ||0–1–0–0 || 
|- align="center" bgcolor="#FFBBBB"
|2||L||October 6, 2001||0–3 || align="left"|  New York Islanders (2001–02) ||0–2–0–0 || 
|- align="center" bgcolor="#CCFFCC" 
|3||W||October 7, 2001||5–0 || align="left"| @ Tampa Bay Lightning (2001–02) ||1–2–0–0 || 
|- align="center" bgcolor="#FFBBBB"
|4||L||October 10, 2001||0–2 || align="left"|  Ottawa Senators (2001–02) ||1–3–0–0 || 
|- align="center" bgcolor="#FFBBBB"
|5||L||October 13, 2001||2–5 || align="left"|  Philadelphia Flyers (2001–02) ||1–4–0–0 || 
|- align="center" 
|6||T||October 16, 2001||2–2 OT|| align="left"| @ Vancouver Canucks (2001–02) ||1–4–1–0 || 
|- align="center" bgcolor="#FFBBBB"
|7||L||October 18, 2001||1–3 || align="left"| @ Calgary Flames (2001–02) ||1–5–1–0 || 
|- align="center" bgcolor="#FFBBBB"
|8||L||October 20, 2001||2–6 || align="left"| @ Edmonton Oilers (2001–02) ||1–6–1–0 || 
|- align="center" bgcolor="#FF6F6F"
|9||OTL||October 24, 2001||3–4 OT|| align="left"|  Washington Capitals (2001–02) ||1–6–1–1 || 
|- align="center" bgcolor="#CCFFCC" 
|10||W||October 26, 2001||3–2 || align="left"|  Los Angeles Kings (2001–02) ||2–6–1–1 || 
|- align="center" 
|11||T||October 28, 2001||2–2 OT|| align="left"| @ Pittsburgh Penguins (2001–02) ||2–6–2–1 || 
|- align="center" bgcolor="#FFBBBB"
|12||L||October 30, 2001||2–3 || align="left"| @ New York Islanders (2001–02) ||2–7–2–1 || 
|- align="center" bgcolor="#CCFFCC" 
|13||W||October 31, 2001||3–1 || align="left"| @ New York Rangers (2001–02) ||3–7–2–1 || 
|-

|- align="center" bgcolor="#FFBBBB"
|14||L||November 3, 2001||3–5 || align="left"|  New York Rangers (2001–02) ||3–8–2–1 || 
|- align="center" bgcolor="#CCFFCC" 
|15||W||November 7, 2001||2–0 || align="left"|  Pittsburgh Penguins (2001–02) ||4–8–2–1 || 
|- align="center" bgcolor="#FF6F6F"
|16||OTL||November 10, 2001||2–3 OT|| align="left"|  Philadelphia Flyers (2001–02) ||4–8–2–2 || 
|- align="center" bgcolor="#FFBBBB"
|17||L||November 12, 2001||3–5 || align="left"|  Buffalo Sabres (2001–02) ||4–9–2–2 || 
|- align="center" bgcolor="#FFBBBB"
|18||L||November 14, 2001||2–3 || align="left"|  Toronto Maple Leafs (2001–02) ||4–10–2–2 || 
|- align="center" bgcolor="#CCFFCC" 
|19||W||November 16, 2001||2–0 || align="left"| @ Buffalo Sabres (2001–02) ||5–10–2–2 || 
|- align="center" bgcolor="#FF6F6F"
|20||OTL||November 17, 2001||0–1 OT|| align="left"| @ Montreal Canadiens (2001–02) ||5–10–2–3 || 
|- align="center" bgcolor="#FFBBBB"
|21||L||November 19, 2001||1–5 || align="left"| @ Toronto Maple Leafs (2001–02) ||5–11–2–3 || 
|- align="center" bgcolor="#CCFFCC" 
|22||W||November 21, 2001||6–0 || align="left"|  Mighty Ducks of Anaheim (2001–02) ||6–11–2–3 || 
|- align="center" bgcolor="#FFBBBB"
|23||L||November 24, 2001||1–5 || align="left"|  New Jersey Devils (2001–02) ||6–12–2–3 || 
|- align="center" bgcolor="#FFBBBB"
|24||L||November 27, 2001||1–4 || align="left"| @ Colorado Avalanche (2001–02) ||6–13–2–3 || 
|- align="center" bgcolor="#FFBBBB"
|25||L||November 29, 2001||0–6 || align="left"| @ Minnesota Wild (2001–02) ||6–14–2–3 || 
|-

|- align="center" bgcolor="#FFBBBB"
|26||L||December 1, 2001||2–5 || align="left"|  Atlanta Thrashers (2001–02) ||6–15–2–3 || 
|- align="center" bgcolor="#CCFFCC" 
|27||W||December 5, 2001||2–0 || align="left"|  Columbus Blue Jackets (2001–02) ||7–15–2–3 || 
|- align="center" bgcolor="#FFBBBB"
|28||L||December 8, 2001||2–3 || align="left"|  Carolina Hurricanes (2001–02) ||7–16–2–3 || 
|- align="center" bgcolor="#FFBBBB"
|29||L||December 12, 2001||1–4 || align="left"| @ Carolina Hurricanes (2001–02) ||7–17–2–3 || 
|- align="center" bgcolor="#CCFFCC" 
|30||W||December 14, 2001||3–2 || align="left"| @ New Jersey Devils (2001–02) ||8–17–2–3 || 
|- align="center" bgcolor="#CCFFCC" 
|31||W||December 15, 2001||3–1 || align="left"| @ New York Islanders (2001–02) ||9–17–2–3 || 
|- align="center" bgcolor="#FFBBBB"
|32||L||December 17, 2001||2–4 || align="left"| @ New York Rangers (2001–02) ||9–18–2–3 || 
|- align="center" bgcolor="#CCFFCC" 
|33||W||December 19, 2001||5–2 || align="left"|  Washington Capitals (2001–02) ||10–18–2–3 || 
|- align="center" bgcolor="#FFBBBB"
|34||L||December 22, 2001||0–2 || align="left"|  St. Louis Blues (2001–02) ||10–19–2–3 || 
|- align="center" 
|35||T||December 26, 2001||3–3 OT|| align="left"| @ Atlanta Thrashers (2001–02) ||10–19–3–3 || 
|- align="center" bgcolor="#FFBBBB"
|36||L||December 28, 2001||1–7 || align="left"|  Boston Bruins (2001–02) ||10–20–3–3 || 
|- align="center" bgcolor="#CCFFCC" 
|37||W||December 29, 2001||4–2 || align="left"|  Toronto Maple Leafs (2001–02) ||11–20–3–3 || 
|- align="center" bgcolor="#CCFFCC" 
|38||W||December 31, 2001||4–3 || align="left"|  Atlanta Thrashers (2001–02) ||12–20–3–3 || 
|-

|- align="center" bgcolor="#FFBBBB"
|39||L||January 2, 2002||1–3 || align="left"| @ Los Angeles Kings (2001–02) ||12–21–3–3 || 
|- align="center" bgcolor="#CCFFCC" 
|40||W||January 4, 2002||2–1 || align="left"| @ Mighty Ducks of Anaheim (2001–02) ||13–21–3–3 || 
|- align="center" bgcolor="#FFBBBB"
|41||L||January 5, 2002||0–6 || align="left"| @ San Jose Sharks (2001–02) ||13–22–3–3 || 
|- align="center" bgcolor="#CCFFCC" 
|42||W||January 7, 2002||2–1 || align="left"| @ Washington Capitals (2001–02) ||14–22–3–3 || 
|- align="center" bgcolor="#FFBBBB"
|43||L||January 9, 2002||2–3 || align="left"|  Dallas Stars (2001–02) ||14–23–3–3 || 
|- align="center" bgcolor="#FFBBBB"
|44||L||January 11, 2002||2–4 || align="left"|  Ottawa Senators (2001–02) ||14–24–3–3 || 
|- align="center" bgcolor="#FFBBBB"
|45||L||January 12, 2002||0–1 || align="left"|  Washington Capitals (2001–02) ||14–25–3–3 || 
|- align="center" bgcolor="#FFBBBB"
|46||L||January 16, 2002||0–3 || align="left"|  Chicago Blackhawks (2001–02) ||14–26–3–3 || 
|- align="center" bgcolor="#CCFFCC" 
|47||W||January 18, 2002||3–2 || align="left"| @ Dallas Stars (2001–02) ||15–26–3–3 || 
|- align="center" bgcolor="#FFBBBB"
|48||L||January 19, 2002||1–6 || align="left"|  Atlanta Thrashers (2001–02) ||15–27–3–3 || 
|- align="center" bgcolor="#CCFFCC" 
|49||W||January 21, 2002||7–5 || align="left"|  Montreal Canadiens (2001–02) ||16–27–3–3 || 
|- align="center" bgcolor="#FFBBBB"
|50||L||January 23, 2002||1–3 || align="left"|  New Jersey Devils (2001–02) ||16–28–3–3 || 
|- align="center" 
|51||T||January 25, 2002||1–1 OT|| align="left"| @ Carolina Hurricanes (2001–02) ||16–28–4–3 || 
|- align="center" bgcolor="#FFBBBB"
|52||L||January 26, 2002||2–4 || align="left"| @ Boston Bruins (2001–02) ||16–29–4–3 || 
|- align="center" bgcolor="#FFBBBB"
|53||L||January 30, 2002||1–3 || align="left"|  Phoenix Coyotes (2001–02) ||16–30–4–3 || 
|-

|- align="center" 
|54||T||February 4, 2002||6–6 OT|| align="left"|  New York Islanders (2001–02) ||16–30–5–3 || 
|- align="center" bgcolor="#FFBBBB"
|55||L||February 6, 2002||2–3 || align="left"|  Tampa Bay Lightning (2001–02) ||16–31–5–3 || 
|- align="center" bgcolor="#CCFFCC" 
|56||W||February 7, 2002||3–1 || align="left"| @ Tampa Bay Lightning (2001–02) ||17–31–5–3 || 
|- align="center" bgcolor="#FFBBBB"
|57||L||February 9, 2002||1–4 || align="left"| @ Boston Bruins (2001–02) ||17–32–5–3 || 
|- align="center" bgcolor="#FFBBBB"
|58||L||February 12, 2002||0–1 || align="left"| @ Nashville Predators (2001–02) ||17–33–5–3 || 
|- align="center" bgcolor="#FFBBBB"
|59||L||February 13, 2002||4–5 || align="left"| @ Chicago Blackhawks (2001–02) ||17–34–5–3 || 
|- align="center" bgcolor="#FFBBBB"
|60||L||February 26, 2002||3–4 || align="left"| @ Washington Capitals (2001–02) ||17–35–5–3 || 
|- align="center" bgcolor="#FF6F6F"
|61||OTL||February 27, 2002||2–3 OT|| align="left"|  Detroit Red Wings (2001–02) ||17–35–5–4 || 
|-

|- align="center" bgcolor="#FFBBBB"
|62||L||March 2, 2002||2–3 || align="left"| @ Tampa Bay Lightning (2001–02) ||17–36–5–4 || 
|- align="center" bgcolor="#FF6F6F"
|63||OTL||March 5, 2002||5–6 OT|| align="left"| @ Pittsburgh Penguins (2001–02) ||17–36–5–5 || 
|- align="center" bgcolor="#CCFFCC" 
|64||W||March 8, 2002||5–4 || align="left"|  Edmonton Oilers (2001–02) ||18–36–5–5 || 
|- align="center" 
|65||T||March 9, 2002||2–2 OT|| align="left"|  Nashville Predators (2001–02) ||18–36–6–5 || 
|- align="center" 
|66||T||March 13, 2002||3–3 OT|| align="left"|  Calgary Flames (2001–02) ||18–36–7–5 || 
|- align="center" bgcolor="#CCFFCC" 
|67||W||March 15, 2002||5–2 || align="left"|  Buffalo Sabres (2001–02) ||19–36–7–5 || 
|- align="center" bgcolor="#FFBBBB"
|68||L||March 17, 2002||0–2 || align="left"| @ Ottawa Senators (2001–02) ||19–37–7–5 || 
|- align="center" bgcolor="#FFBBBB"
|69||L||March 20, 2002||1–4 || align="left"|  Montreal Canadiens (2001–02) ||19–38–7–5 || 
|- align="center" bgcolor="#FFBBBB"
|70||L||March 21, 2002||2–3 || align="left"| @ Carolina Hurricanes (2001–02) ||19–39–7–5 || 
|- align="center" bgcolor="#FFBBBB"
|71||L||March 23, 2002||1–3 || align="left"|  Boston Bruins (2001–02) ||19–40–7–5 || 
|- align="center" bgcolor="#FFBBBB"
|72||L||March 25, 2002||1–3 || align="left"| @ New Jersey Devils (2001–02) ||19–41–7–5 || 
|- align="center" bgcolor="#CCFFCC" 
|73||W||March 26, 2002||2–1 || align="left"| @ Montreal Canadiens (2001–02) ||20–41–7–5 || 
|- align="center" bgcolor="#CCFFCC" 
|74||W||March 28, 2002||4–3 || align="left"| @ Ottawa Senators (2001–02) ||21–41–7–5 || 
|- align="center" bgcolor="#FFBBBB"
|75||L||March 30, 2002||2–4 || align="left"|  New York Rangers (2001–02) ||21–42–7–5 || 
|-

|- align="center" bgcolor="#CCFFCC" 
|76||W||April 3, 2002||3–2 || align="left"|  Pittsburgh Penguins (2001–02) ||22–42–7–5 || 
|- align="center" bgcolor="#FFBBBB"
|77||L||April 5, 2002||1–3 || align="left"| @ Buffalo Sabres (2001–02) ||22–43–7–5 || 
|- align="center" 
|78||T||April 6, 2002||2–2 OT|| align="left"| @ Toronto Maple Leafs (2001–02) ||22–43–8–5 || 
|- align="center" 
|79||T||April 8, 2002||4–4 OT|| align="left"| @ Philadelphia Flyers (2001–02) ||22–43–9–5 || 
|- align="center" 
|80||T||April 10, 2002||4–4 OT|| align="left"| @ Atlanta Thrashers (2001–02) ||22–43–10–5 || 
|- align="center" bgcolor="#FFBBBB"
|81||L||April 12, 2002||1–3 || align="left"|  Carolina Hurricanes (2001–02) ||22–44–10–5 || 
|- align="center" bgcolor="#FF6F6F"
|82||OTL||April 14, 2002||2–3 OT|| align="left"|  Tampa Bay Lightning (2001–02) ||22–44–10–6 || 
|-

|-
| Legend:

Player statistics

Scoring
 Position abbreviations: C = Center; D = Defense; G = Goaltender; LW = Left Wing; RW = Right Wing
  = Joined team via a transaction (e.g., trade, waivers, signing) during the season. Stats reflect time with the Panthers only.
  = Left team via a transaction (e.g., trade, waivers, release) during the season. Stats reflect time with the Panthers only.

Goaltending

Awards and records

Transactions
The Panthers were involved in the following transactions from June 10, 2001, the day after the deciding game of the 2001 Stanley Cup Finals, through June 13, 2002, the day of the deciding game of the 2002 Stanley Cup Finals.

Trades

Players acquired

Players lost

Signings

Draft picks
Florida's draft picks at the 2001 NHL Entry Draft held at the National Car Rental Center in Sunrise, Florida.

See also
2001–02 NHL season

Notes

References

Flo
Flo
Florida Panthers seasons
Florida Panthers
Florida Panthers